The hoary wattled bat (Chalinolobus nigrogriseus) is a species of vesper bat found in northern Australia and Papua New Guinea. Two subspecies are currently recognised:
 C. n. nigrogriseus (Gould, 1852)
 C. n. rogersi (Thomas, 1909)

References

Taxa named by John Gould
Chalinolobus
Mammals described in 1852
Bats of Australia
Bats of Oceania
Mammals of Papua New Guinea
Mammals of Western New Guinea
Mammals of the Northern Territory
Mammals of Western Australia
Mammals of New South Wales
Mammals of Queensland
Taxonomy articles created by Polbot
Bats of New Guinea